Mario Fernando Hernández Bonilla (7 December 1966 – 22 November 2008) was a Liberal Party congressman for the Cortés Department in Honduras from January 2006 until his death. He was secretary for the legislative committee on Industry and Commerce and the legislative committee on Drug Trafficking and Security and was also a member of the legislative committee for Peace and Democracy. In addition he acted as alternative vice president (speaker) of Congress. He had a degree in business administration at University of San Pedro Sula.

Hernández was assassinated on 22 November 2008 in San Pedro Sula along with two of his colleagues while on his way to a meeting with activists in the Cabañas neighbourhood. He was an important supporter of Liberal presidential candidate Roberto Micheletti.

References

1966 births
2008 deaths
Deputies of the National Congress of Honduras
Assassinated Honduran politicians
People murdered in Honduras
Deaths by firearm in Honduras
Liberal Party of Honduras politicians
People from Cortés Department